The Preiss RHJ-9 is an evolution of the RHJ-7 and RHJ-8 side-by-side two-seat flapped homebuilt gliders. The wingspan was increased to 18.29 m and the maximum mass was raised to 500 kg. A wing construction similar to that of the later HP-18 was adopted employing foam ribs bonded to the aluminum spars and skins. It first flew in 1978.

Specifications

References
sailplanedirectory.com

External links
An RHJ-9 owner's page

1970s United States sailplanes
Glider aircraft
Aircraft first flown in 1978